Massimo Rivola (born 7 December 1971) is an Italian motorsport official and the sports director for Aprilia in MotoGP.

Career 
After graduating in 1996 in economics and commerce at the University of Bologna, in 1998 he began his career in Formula 1 at the marketing office of Minardi. In 2000 he became sponsor of the team from Faenza, and two years later he was appointed marketing manager.

In 2003, again at Minardi, he was appointed deputy team manager, and two years later he became sporting director and team manager. After the acquisition of Minardi by Red Bull and subsequent renaming into Scuderia Toro Rosso, he remained in Faenza as team manager from 2006 to 2008.

In 2009 he arrived at Ferrari where he went to occupy the position of sporting director, working among others with drivers such as Fernando Alonso and Sebastian Vettel; again in the Maranello outfit, in 2016 he became director of the Ferrari Driver Academy, contributing to launch the promising Charles Leclerc in the top racing series.

After ten years in Maranello, in 2019 he left Ferrari and Formula 1 to move to the motorcycle World Championship, as CEO of the Aprilia team in MotoGP.

References

1971 births
Living people
Formula One people
Ferrari people